Anna Wolff-Powęska (born 1941) is a Polish historian and political scientist specialising in Polish-German relations. She was the director of the Western Institute (Instytut Zachodni) in Poznań from 1990 to 2004.

In 1964, she graduated in history from the Philosophical-Historical Department of Adam Mickiewicz University in Poznań. For a few years, she taught history in primary schools, until she was employed by the Western Institute (Instytut Zachodni) in Poznań in 1969. In 1970, she obtained a Ph.D., and in 1980 she completed her habilitation with a thesis on political and law doctrines at the same university. She became full professor in 1986 and was made director of the Western Institute in 1990. She left this post in 2004, but continues to work at the institute.

Areas of activity
Wolff-Powęska's main areas of interest are the history of German political thought and the political culture of Central-Eastern Europe.

Awards
In 2005, Wolff-Powęska received the Polish-German Award for special contribution to Polish-German relations.

Publications
 Doktryna geopolityki w Niemczech (1979),
 Polityczne i filozoficzne nurty konserwatyzmu w Republice Federalnej Niemiec (1984),
 Niemiecka myśl polityczna wieku oświecenia (1988),
 Wspólna Europa. Mit czy rzeczywistość (praca zbiorowa, 1990),
 Polacy wobec Niemców. Z dziejów kultury politycznej Polskiej Rzeczypospolitej Ludowej 1945-1989 (1993),
 Oswojona Rewolucja. Europa Środkowo-Wschodnia w procesie demokratyzacji (1998),
 Polen in Deutschland, Integration oder Separation? (2000),
 Przestrzeń i polityka. Z dziejów niemieckiej myśli politycznej (antologia, red. 2000),
 A bliźniego swego... Kościoły w Niemczech wobec „problemu żydowskiego” (2003).

References

20th-century Polish historians
Writers from Poznań
Living people
1941 births
Polish women historians
21st-century Polish historians
Recipients of the European Citizen's Prize